Bratulić is a Croatian surname. The surname may refer to:

 Josip Bratulić (born 1939), Croatian philologist and a historian of literature and culture
 Šimun Bratulić (1550-1611), Croatian bishop
 Vjekoslav Bratulić (1911-1995), Croatian historian

Croatian surnames